Nathan Daniel Moriah-Welsh (born 18 March 2002) is a professional footballer who plays as a midfielder for Newport County on loan from Premier League club AFC Bournemouth. Born in England, he plays for the Guyana national team.

Club career

Early career
Born in Chelsea, Moriah-Welsh had spells with Brentford and Reading, before joining Bournemouth in the summer of 2018.

AFC Bournemouth
Moriah-Welsh debuted for the under-21s in April 2019 while training alongside the first team. He was named in the match day squad for the first time in the FA Cup quarter-final tie with Southampton in March 2021. He made his first start and first team appearance for the club in the FA Cup Third Round, a 3–1 away win against Yeovil Town.

Newport County (loan)
On 10 August 2022, Moriah-Welsh joined EFL League Two club Newport County on loan for the 2022–23 season. He made his debut for the club on 16 August 2022 as a second half substitute in a 3–2 league defeat to Salford City. He scored his first goal for the club on 20 August in a 2–1 league win against Tranmere Rovers.

International career
Born in England, Moriah-Welsh was also eligible to represent Guyana and Grenada in international football. He chose to play for Guyana after having talks with their national team's head scout.

Moriah-Welsh received his first call-up to Guyana national team in March 2021 for World Cup qualifying matches against Trinidad and Tobago and Bahamas. He made his international debut on 30 March 2021 in a 4–0 win against Bahamas.

On 14 June 2022, Moriah-Welsh captained the Guyana national team for the first time when captain Samuel Cox was substituted in the 62nd minute vs Haiti in a 6-0 Loss in the Dominican Republic

Career statistics

Club

International

Scores and results list Guyana's goal tally first, score column indicates score after each Moriah-Welsh goal.

References

External links
 
 

2002 births
Living people
Footballers from Chelsea, London
Guyanese people of Grenadian descent
English people of Guyanese descent
English sportspeople of Grenadian descent
Black British sportspeople
Association football midfielders
Footballers from Greater London
Guyanese footballers
Guyana international footballers
English footballers
AFC Bournemouth players
Newport County A.F.C. players
English Football League players